Konnakkad is a hilly region in Maloth village of Kasaragod District in the state of Kerala. Konnakkad is Located in Kerala-Karnataka Border.

Transportation
Konnakkad is able to connect Karnataka state through Kanhangad-Panathur-Madikeri Road from Odayanchal.

Ksrtc Buses provide routes to Kanhangad, Nileshwar, Kasaragod, Kannur, Kozhikode , Thrissur , Guruvayur, Kumali, Pala, Muvattupuzha ,
Ernakulam and Kottayam.

The nearest Railway station is Nileshwar on Mangalore-Palakkad Line. 

The nearest Airport is Mangalore on North and Kannur on South.

Tourist attractions
Konnakkad is located in the Hill range of Kasaragod. Talakaveri temple the origin of Kaveri River is nearest to Konnakkad.

Kottancheri Hills is situated in Konnakkad Village. It is very beautiful rain Forest in Kasaragod District.

References

Kanhangad area